The CS/MPQ-90 Bee Eye is a Taiwanese active electronically scanned array (AESA) type radar developed by the National Chung-Shan Institute of Science and Technology (NCSIST).

Description
The CS/MPQ-90 is a short-medium range 3D air defense AESA radar designed and produced by the NCSIST.

Development scandal
In 2011 NCSIST awarded the MiTAC electronics company a NT$70 million (US$2.22 million) contract to build one prototype “Radar Vehicle for Field Operation and Air Defense.” In 2015 police in Taoyuan took into custody three workers and one manager from MiTAC on charges of forgery of data and fabrication of test results. The tender required the vehicle to be able to advance at 8 km/h up a 40 degree incline, the vehicle MiTAC delivered could only advance at 6 km/h. Three NCSIST staff were also detained on suspicion of colluding with the MiTAC employees to fabricate test results, these staff then presented the fabricated results to their superiors for approval. The Taoyuan District Prosecutors’ Office began investigating after receiving a tip.

Variants

Naval
A naval version known as the “Sea Bee Eye” was installed aboard ROCN Hwai Yang (FFG-937) for testing.

The naval version is to be deployed as the air search and target indication radar component of the TC-2N surface-to-air missile system, as part of a self-contained fire control system aboard Taiwan’s Kang Ding (La Fayette) class frigates/Ta Chiang(PGG-619) and as part of the central combat management system aboard the new amphibious warfare ship which is scheduled to enter service in 2021.

Land based
The CS/MPQ-90 has been integrated with Taiwan’s AN/TWQ-1 Avenger missile batteries. 

Operational land-based systems were first seen in public in 2010.

Six systems were ordered in 2019 to equip TC-2 missile batteries.

See also
AN/MPQ-64 Sentinel
Giraffe radar

References

Ground radars
Naval radars
Military radars of Taiwan
Military equipment introduced in the 2010s